Karolin Luger is an Austrian-American biochemist and biophysicist known for her work with nucleosomes and discovery of the three-dimensional structure of chromatin. She is a University Distinguished Professor at Colorado State University in Fort Collins and works with the University of Colorado School of Medicine's Department of Biochemistry and Molecular Genetics.

Life 
Luger was born the youngest child after several brothers. Though not interested in mathematics, electronics, or physics, as her brothers were, she became fascinated with biology. She has stated that she chose a career in science during middle school, when she realized that "not everything was 'known' yet". As a young woman in Austria, Luger attended a gymnasium where she specialized in foreign languages.

Luger is married and has one daughter.

Education 
Luger earned a Bachelor of Science in microbiology and a Master of Science in biochemistry from the University of Innsbruck. She completed her Ph.D in biochemistry and biophysics at the University of Basel.

Career 
In 1997, as a postdoc with Timothy Richmond, Luger was first author on the paper that described the first structure determined for the nucleosome. The structure was discovered by X-ray crystallography. She also proposed that histone-DNA bonds are weaker at points where less of the histone contacts the DNA, which was confirmed by Michelle Wang in a 2009 paper. After several years at the Swiss Federal Institute of Technology, Luger was hired by Colorado State University in 1999. Her work there includes extensive further research on the nucleosome's three-dimensional structure. The nucleosome, a building block of the chromatin genetic material that makes up chromosomes, consists of DNA wrapped around a disk of proteins. In 2005, Luger and Kenneth Kaye used X-ray crystallography to determine the mechanism that the virus causing Kaposi's sarcoma, a cancer that affects subdermal connective tissue, uses to spread. The virus attaches to chromatin and inserts its genetic material, which is then copied along with the cell's DNA. Luger and Kaye thus showed that a virus can attach to chromatin as a "docking platform".

Since 2010, Luger has done significant studies of histones, researching the connection between their chaperone proteins and acetylation, as well as variant structures. Histones are important in the process of gene expression, and their positioning as determined by chaperone proteins is essential to that role. The chaperones also can change the conformation of the nucleosome as a whole. Modifications to histones, including acetylation, methylation, and phosphorylation, are important because of their role in activating and deactivating genes. In 2008, Luger published a study that showed that physical changes to the nucleosome do not occur when DNA is methylated. Luger's research as of 2012 also comprises several other areas of study with chromatin, including the processes of DNA replication, transcription, recombination, and repair in chromatin. She and her research group have also developed various assays for examining chromatin structure, to augment traditional X-ray crystallography. Another related research interest for Luger's research group is the genetic cause of Rett syndrome, the gene MECP2. The gene codes for a protein that binds to methyl groups on chromatin, altering its conformation.

Honors 
Luger has received many honors throughout her career. While in Austria, she received the State of Vorarlberg's State Science Prize. She was the recipient of the Searle Scholar Award in 1999, her first year as a professor at Colorado State University. In 2003, she was named a Monfort Professor and awarded $75,000 a year for two years in research funds by the university. Two years later, Luger was appointed as an investigator at the Howard Hughes Medical Institute. From 2008 to 2012, Luger sat on the National Institute of General Medical Sciences' advisory board.

She has also received several prestigious grants throughout her career, including a 5-year award from the National Institute of Health and a $1.2 million grant from the W. M. Keck Foundation.

In 2012, Luger was chosen to be the National Lecturer for the Biophysical Society's 2013 meeting.

In 2017, Luger has been selected to the American Academy of Arts and Sciences.

In 2018, Luger was elected to the National Academy of Sciences.

References 

Austrian biophysicists
Austrian biochemists
American women biochemists
American biophysicists
Women biophysicists
Colorado State University faculty
Austrian women scientists
Living people
Howard Hughes Medical Investigators
21st-century American women scientists
Year of birth missing (living people)
University of Basel alumni
American women academics